Mandlate is a surname. Notable people with the surname include:

 Fernando Mandlate (born 1985), Mozambican basketball player
 Paulo Mandlate (1934–2019), Mozambican Roman Catholic bishop

Bantu-language surnames